Break the Rules may refer to:

Break the Rules (album), a 2000 album by Namie Amuro
"Break the Rules" (Charli XCX song)
"Break the Rules", a song by Simon Viklund and Phil Bardowell from Payday 2
"Break the Rules" (Status Quo song)

See also
 "Break the Rules Tonite", a song by Kim Carnes